Vaceuchelus natalensis is a species of sea snail, a marine gastropod mollusk in the family Chilodontidae.

Description
The size of the shell varies between 2 mm and 4 mm.

A beautiful little, dark white, globose-turbinate species that contains  4½ whorls. It is allied to A. foveolatus (A. Adams, 1853) from Lord Hood Island. It is, however, much smaller than that species. It is more delicately sculptured, the spiral keels being regular and simple, whereas in A. foveolatus they are subspinose where the oblique lamellas join them. Besides the six carinas mentioned above, a seventh is noticeable upon the body whorl close to the suture, and this may be traced upon the penultimate volution also.

Distribution
This marine species occurs off KwaZuluNatal, South Africa.

References

External links
 To Encyclopedia of Life
 To World Register of Marine Species
 

natalensis
Gastropods described in 1906